Baeckea trapeza is a species of flowering plant in the family Myrtaceae and is endemic to Queensland. It is a shrub with lance-shaped leaves with the narrower end towards the base, and white flowers with eight to eleven stamens.

Description

Taxonomy
Baeckea trapeza was first formally described in 1997 by Anthony Bean in the journal Telopea from specimens he collected on the Blackdown Tableland in 1996. The specific epithet (trapeza) means "a table", referring to the distribution of the species on the Blackdown Tableland.

Distribution and habitat

References

Flora of Queensland
trapeza
Plants described in 1997
Taxa named by Anthony Bean